In environmental engineering, the flood mitigation involves the management and control of flood water movement, such as redirecting flood run-off through the use of floodwalls and flood gates, rather than trying to prevent floods altogether. It also involves the management of people, through measures such as evacuation and dry/wet proofing properties. The prevention and mitigation of flooding can be studied on three levels: on individual properties, small communities, and whole towns or cities. The costs of protection rise as more people and property are protected. The US FEMA, for example, estimates that for every $1.00 spent on mitigation, $4.00 is saved.

Protection of individual properties

Property owners may fit their homes to stop water entering by blocking doors and air vents, waterproofing important areas and sandbagging the edges of the building.

Flood mitigation at the property level may also involve preventative measures focused on the building site, including scour protection for shoreline developments, improving rainwater in filtration through the use of permeable paving materials and grading away from structures, and inclusion of berms, wetlands or swales in the landscape.

Protection of communities
When more homes, shops and infrastructure are threatened by the effects of flooding, then the benefits of  protection are worth the additional cost. Temporary flood defenses can be constructed  in certain locations which are prone to floods and provide protection from rising flood waters. Rivers running through large urban developments are often controlled and channeled. Water rising above a canal's full capacity may cause flooding to spread to other waterways and areas of the community, which causes damage. Defenses (both long-term and short-term) can be constructed to minimize damage, which involves raising the edge of the water with levees, embankments or walls. The high population and value of infrastructure at risk often justifies the high cost of mitigation in larger urban areas.

Flood risk management

The most effective way of reducing the risk to people and property is through the production of flood risk maps. Most countries have produced maps which show areas prone to flooding based on flood data. In the UK, the Environment Agency has produced maps which show areas at risk. The map to the right shows a flood map for the City of York, including the floodplain for a 1 in 100-year flood (dark blue), the predicted floodplain for a 1 in 1000 year flood (light blue) and low-lying areas in need of flood defence (purple). The most sustainable way of reducing risk is to prevent further development in flood-prone areas and old waterways. It is important for at-risk communities to develop a comprehensive Floodplain Management plan. 

In the US, communities that participate in the National Flood Insurance Program must agree to regulate development in flood-prone areas.

See also

References

External links
Water Damage Restoration
Alberta WaterPortal Flood Mitigation Methods

Mitigation